Lewis Rutherfurd may refer to:

 Lewis Morris Rutherfurd (1816–1892), American lawyer and astronomer
 Lewis Morris Rutherfurd Jr. (1859–1901), American socialite and sportsman
 Lewis Polk Rutherfurd (born ), American-born financier in Hong Kong